Music FM may refer to:
Music FM Radio Guangdong, a radio station in Guangdong, People's Republic of China
Music FM (Hungary), a radio station in Hungary
Music FM (Romania), a radio station in Romania